David A. Benaron (born November 21, 1958) is an American digital health entrepreneur, physician, and former Stanford University professor. His work in the field of medical optical imaging, digital health wearables, and predictive behavioral and health Artificial Intelligence led to the founding of multiple public companies. He is a member of SPIE (the International Society for Optics and Photonics), and a founding editorial board member of the Journal of Biomedical Optics.

Education 
Benaron studied biochemistry at University of California at Davis. He completed graduate school at Harvard Medical School and Massachusetts Institute of Technology Health Sciences and Technology programs. He completed fellowships in physiology at the National Institutes of Health under Dr. Maria Delivoria-Papadopoulos, in biophysics at the University of Pennsylvania under Dr. Britton Chance, and at Stanford Medical School in neonatal intensive care under  Dr. David K. Stevenson.

Career

Academic 
Benaron joined the faculty of the Division of Neonatal and Developmental Medicine in the Department of Pediatrics at Stanford University in 1989. During his 13 years as a professor, he contributed to key accomplishments and events in neonatology, including the development of novel imaging techniques – such as the first optical imaging of infection in vivo ‒ with colleagues Chris Contag, Susan R. Hintz and David K. Stevenson, as well as founding the Stanford biophotonics lab. He left Stanford in 2002, but continued his association with the university as a consulting professor until 2016.

Entrepreneur 

Benaron founded his first company when he was 13, and received his first venture capital while in medical school for a device to improve medication compliance. However, it was his work in medical imaging and analysis at Stanford that led him to establish five biotechnology companies specialized in optical sensing and optical imaging. Among his innovations are the green light heart rate sensor now found in wearable health bands; the use of glowing genes to image and track cancer and infection in the body (luciferase imaging), and the use of white light spectroscopy for analysis and imaging inside the body, for example for measuring oxygen saturation in tissues.

In 2002 he received the Tibbetts award from the United States Congress for commercialization of scientific innovations and was inducted into the Stanford Inventors Hall of Fame in 2012 for his "glowing mice" – a technique that uses bioluminescent bacteria for real-time pathogen imaging.

Digital health 
Benaron was a strategic advisor for California-based mobile technology company cellNumerate from 2012-2015. He became Chief Medical Officer at Jawbone, focusing on the development of wearables for monitoring health metrics, after the acquisition of his company Spectros in 2015.  He joined Jawbone Health as Chief Medical Officer (one of its two C-level officers) in 2017.

At a panel on precision medicine at the 2016 BIO International Convention in San Francisco, Benaron spoke about a future where the need for regular health check-ups could be replaced by wearable health monitoring, and where big data and precision medicine could help to prevent chronic disease through early detection. More recently, he has been working to extract deep intent from analysis or the digital exhaust we leave behind during our daily activities, to understand mood, motivation, and mindset.

Personal life 
David Benaron was born in Los Angeles, California to Canadian parents. His grandparents were Russian and Polish immigrants. He has two children.

Benaron is a furry. He owns 47 custom fursuits and regularly attends work in one.

References 

1958 births
Living people
American people of Canadian descent
American people of Russian descent
American people of Polish descent
20th-century American physicians
21st-century American physicians
University of California, Davis alumni
Harvard Medical School alumni
Massachusetts Institute of Technology alumni
Stanford University faculty
Scientists from California
Furry fandom people
Businesspeople from Los Angeles